Schinus engleri is a species of plant in the family Anacardiaceae. It is found in Argentina, Brazil, and Uruguay. It is threatened by habitat loss.

References

engleri
Data deficient plants
Taxonomy articles created by Polbot